Minnesota's 10th congressional district is an obsolete congressional district which existed from 1915 to 1933. It was created from the results of the 1910 census and generally consisted of the current  and  districts and the southern portion of the  district. It was abolished following the 1930 census.

It was represented by only two people, both Republicans: Thomas D. Schall and Godfrey G. Goodwin.

List of members representing the district

Election results

1914

1916

1918

1920

1922

1924

1926

1928

1930

References

 Congressional Biographical Directory of the United States 1774–present

10
Former congressional districts of the United States
1915 establishments in Minnesota
1933 disestablishments in Minnesota